Willy Faktorovitch was a cinematographer. There is some doubt over the year and place of his birth, possibly in Ukraine which was then part of the Russian Empire. He spent his entire career working in the French film industry.

Selected filmography
 Mandrin (1924)
 Destiny (1927)
 Yasmina (1927)
 The Sweetness of Loving (1930)
 The Champion Cook (1932)
 Marinella (1936)
 César (1936)
 A Hen on a Wall (1936)
 Claudine at School (1937)
 Heartbeat (1938)
 Sing Anyway (1940)
 Cristobal's Gold (1940)
 Paris-New York (1940)
 Rooster Heart (1946)
 The Pretty Miller Girl (1949)
 The White Adventure  (1952)
 In the Manner of Sherlock Holmes (1956)
 A Strange Kind of Colonel (1968)

References

Bibliography 
 Jacobs, Diane. Christmas in July: The Life and Art of Preston Sturges. University of California Press, 1992.

External links 
 

Year of birth unknown
Year of death unknown
French cinematographers